Harbour View Elementary School, also called "Harbour View School", is a public school located in the Tufts Cove neighbourhood of north-end Dartmouth, serving about 184 children in the first through sixth grades. The school's preschool program, student services offices, and dental clinic are in the building. The principal is Fournier, Dan. The school participates in the "Our Healthy School" program of the Halifax Regional Centre for Education.

History
The school was first built in 1945, with major construction work also taking place in 1972.

In 1997 and 1998, the school was among 25 taking part in the Nova Scotia Model Schools Program, in which trees and other greenery were planted on school grounds.

Social problems
As of 1996, a significant proportion of the student population lived in poverty. "[T]he principal of this school often goes to the homes herself, to the homes of these children, to assist in whatever way she can," said John Hamm, a party leader speaking on the floor of the Nova Scotia House of Assembly. "The same principal told me that if anyone believes that poverty in Nova Scotia does not exist, they should come with her to some of the homes where these children struggle to survive."

Crime has been a notable feature of the area immediately around the school. Across the street from the school at the Holy Trinity Emmanuel Anglican Church, burglars in both May and June 2007 stole all the food for a program that feeds breakfast to 50 children before school. (The breakfast program has been in existence since at least 1996.)

Crime has been a longstanding problem close to the school. In 2006, a 52-year-old man said he was assaulted in the mid-afternoon of March 24 by teenage youths on a street near the school. "[T]here's a concentration of kids in north-end Dartmouth committing crimes", according to a May 6, 2006, article in The Chronicle Herald of Halifax, Nova Scotia, which quoted several residents.

On September 10, 1998, in a wooded area behind the school, Harbour View students found a 35-year-old woman bleeding from her injuries after an assault. Eight days later, she died from her wounds. As of early 2008, the murder remained unsolved. Early on a Saturday morning in December 2006, a 21-year-old man, beaten and bloody, was found by a passerby on the approach to the Victoria Road pedway at the school. That man also later died of his injuries.

Harbour View Elementary School and John MacNeil Elementary School both feed into John Martin Junior High School. In 2006, Trevor Zinck, a member of the Nova Scotia General Assembly, said some parents in his district were concerned about bullying at the junior high school from children entering it from Harbour View. "This is due to the fact that some of the 'tougher children' come out of the Harbour View school area", Zinck said.

Notes

External links
 Harbour View Elementary School official Web site

Schools in Halifax, Nova Scotia
Elementary schools in Nova Scotia